Jamal Nasir is a former Malaysian footballer who plays for Pahang and Malaysia national team as a right back in the 1970s and in the 1980s. He also a football critic.

International career 
Jamal Nasir represented Malaysia from 1975 to 1984. He was also 
a part of the Malaysian player in qualified to the 1980 Olympic games Moscow which Malaysia boycotted. Malaysia won the play-off against South Korea with a 2–1 score in the Merdeka Stadium. In February 1999, Asian Football Confederation recognize Jamal Nasir achievement of representing the country 111 times (match including Olympic qualification, against national 'B' football team, club side and selection side), 88 caps is against full national team. Thus, Asian Football Confederation include him into the AFC Century Club in 1999.

Honours

Club
Pahang
 Malaysia Cup
Winners: 1983

International
 SEA Games
Winners: 1977, 1979

 Pestabola Merdeka 
Winners: 1979

Individual 
 AFC Century Club 1999
 Goal.com The best Malaysia XI of all time: 2020
IFFHS Men’s All Time Malaysia Dream Team: 2022

References 

1954 births
Living people
Malaysia international footballers
Malaysian expatriate footballers
Sri Pahang FC players
Southeast Asian Games gold medalists for Malaysia
Southeast Asian Games medalists in football
Competitors at the 1977 Southeast Asian Games
Competitors at the 1979 Southeast Asian Games
Malaysian footballers
Association football fullbacks
People from Terengganu